Standards Live is an album recorded by Keith Jarrett's Standards Trio live in concert in Paris, in July 1985. It was published by ECM Records in 1986  and it became the first in a long series of live albums to be released by Keith Jarrett, Gary Peacock and Jack DeJohnette as a unit.

July 1985 Tour
Standards Live was recorded during the "Standards trio" July 1985 European tour which, according to www.keithjarrett.org, offered 12 recitals in 26 days:

 1 - Paris (France)
 2 - Paris (France)
 3 - Ravenna (Italy)
 4 - Ravenna (Italy)
 10 - Montreux (Switzerland)
 12 - Den Haag (Netherlands)
 15 - Lyon (France) during the Nuits de Fourvière festival
 17 - Salon-de-Provence (France)
 18 - San Sebastian - Donostia (Spain) during the San Sebastian Jazz Festival
 19 - San Sebastian - Donostia (Spain)
 23 - Antibes (France)
 26 - Montpellier (France)

Reception
Jazz commentator Scott Yanow states that "[t]he interplay between the players was constantly impressive." The Rough Guide to Jazz describes the concert as "exceptional", singling out the performance of "Too Young to Go Steady" as "one of the most perfect and exultant trio performances in the whole of jazz." In his biography of Jarrett, Ian Carr describes the album as "superlative: the incredible dynamism, the sheer creativity of the three men, the feeling of ecstasy that pervades the whole concert and the interplay and inter-dependence of the trio." Carr singles out "Stella by Starlight" as here "exquisite and gripping".

Track listing
"Stella by Starlight" (Ned Washington, Victor Young) – 11:15
"The Wrong Blues" (William Engvick, Alec Wilder) – 8:03
"Falling in Love with Love" (Lorenz Hart, Richard Rodgers) – 8:44
"Too Young to Go Steady" (Harold Adamson, Jimmy McHugh) – 10:10
"The Way You Look Tonight" (Dorothy Fields, Jerome Kern) – 9:31
"The Old Country" (Nat Adderley, Curtis Lewis) – 6:36

Total effective playing time: 49:02 (the album contains 5:19 applause approximately)

Personnel 
 Keith Jarrett – piano
 Jack DeJohnette – drums
 Gary Peacock – double bass

Production
 Manfred Eicher - producer
 Martin Wieland - recording engineer
 Barbara Wojirsch - design
Franz Kafka – illustration from "The Diaries of Franz Kafka 1914-1923"

References

Further reading 

Standards Trio albums
Gary Peacock live albums
Jack DeJohnette live albums
Keith Jarrett live albums
1985 live albums
Albums produced by Manfred Eicher